The German Lapland Army (AOK Lappland) was one of the two army echelon headquarters controlling German troops in the far north of Norway and Finland during World War II. It was established in January 1942, and renamed the 20th Mountain Army (20. Gebirgsarmee) in June 1942. On 18 December 1944, the 20th Mountain Army took over the role of Wehrmachtsbefehlshaber Norwegen from the dissolved Army of Norway.

Commanders

Commander-in-chiefs

Chiefs of staff
 Generalleutnant Ferdinand Jodl (22 June 1942 – 1 March 1944)
 Generalleutnant Hermann Hölter (1 March 1944 – 8 May 1945)

Units
April 1942

2nd Mountain Division
6th Mountain Division
7th Mountain Division
163rd Infantry Division
169th Infantry Division
210th Infantry Division
SS Division Nord
Finnish 3rd Division
Supporting Units ~
211th Panzer Battalion
741st StuG Battalion
742nd StuG Battalion

See also
 Army Norway (Wehrmacht)

References

 "Armee Lappland / 20. Gebirgs-Armee". German language article at www.lexikon-der-wehrmacht.de. Retrieved 12 April 2005.

20
Military units and formations established in 1942
Military units and formations disestablished in 1945
Mountain units and formations of Germany